Jonathan Meza (born March 30, 1983) is an American voice actor who frequently works with dubbing studio Bang Zoom! Entertainment. He has starred in several anime: his greatest role is Saito Hiraga in The Familiar of Zero. Additionally, he is also known as the voice of Zafira from Nanoha A's, the sequel to the original Nanoha series. Meza is more prominently known for his appearances as the host on AnimeTV and Otaku Movie Anatomy.

As an actor, Meza is known for the popular kids show The Jumpitz which had a successful spot on Nickelodeon for a while and had many tours around the world.

He is also well known for his role as Muddles from the panto A Snow White Christmas, a Lythgoe production.

Filmography

Anime

5 Centimeters Per Second - Teammate
The Familiar of Zero - Saito Hiraga; Osmand
Magical Girl Lyrical Nanoha  - Bardiche
Magical Girl Lyrical Nanoha A's - Bardiche; Zafira
Redline - Additional Voices
Squid Girl - Martin; Devil Squid

References

External links 
 
 

1983 births
Living people
American male voice actors
Male actors from Los Angeles